Adventure in Music is a 1944 American musical film directed by Reginald Le Borg and Ernst Matray. It stars  José Iturbi, Emanuel Feuermann, and Mildred Dilling.

See also
List of American films of 1944

References

External links

1944 films
American musical films
1944 musical films
American black-and-white films
Films directed by Reginald Le Borg
1940s American films